Uvariodendron fuscum is a species of plant in the family Annonaceae. It is endemic to Cameroon.  Its natural habitat is subtropical or tropical dry forests.

References

fuscum
Endemic flora of Cameroon
Near threatened flora of Africa
Taxonomy articles created by Polbot